Troll is a 2022 Norwegian monster film directed by Roar Uthaug. Starring Ine Marie Wilmann, Kim Falck, Mads Sjøgård Pettersen, Gard B. Eidsvold, Pål Richard Lunderby, and Eric Vorenholt, it follows a ragtag group of people who must come together to stop an ancient troll that was awakened in a Norwegian mountain and prevent it from wreaking havoc.

Director Uthaug met with Motion Blur executives when his film Tomb Raider was near completion to discuss creating a film. He decided to utilize a Norwegian folklore-inspired idea that he had been pondering for over 20 years. Concept art of the titular monster attacking Oslo was released in March 2021. Principal photography began in August 2021 and wrapped in November, with location shooting taking place in Askim, Dovre, Indre Østfold, Lom, Øyer, Rena, and Ulsteinvik.

Troll was released by Netflix on 1 December 2022. It received generally positive reviews from critics, with praise for the performances, score, cinematography, direction, visual effects, and action sequences, but criticism towards its derivative plot.

Plot

As a young girl, Nora Tidemann’s father, Tobias, teaches her the mythology of Trolls and the origin of their local mountains. During one story, Nora almost “sees” the faces of trolls turned to stone in the rock face.

Years later, a drilling operation tunneling through the mountains of Dovre results in an eruption and the deaths of several workers and protestors. Desperate for answers, the Norwegian government recruits a diverse array of scientists, including Nora, who is now a paleontologist on her first major find. While the collected scientists initially believe that the eruption was caused by the miners hitting a pocket of Methane, only Nora and the prime minister’s advisor, Andreas Isaksan, point out that the region is surrounded by large impressions that appear to be footprints. The prime minister permits them to investigate the possibility further with Norwegian military soldier, Captain Kris Holm, when a second incident miles away tears apart the home of an elderly couple near Lesja.

Nora begins to believe that a Troll may be responsible and the three seek assistance from Tobias, who has since lost his professorship for his belief in the existence of a real basis for mythical creatures. After a quick search of the mountains, Tobias identifies a topographical anomaly and the four accidentally awaken the slumbering  Troll, having camouflaged itself on the mountainside. They escape, capturing the first tangible video proof of Nora’s theory. 
The prime minister arranges a military operation led by Kris; however, conventional weapons only annoy the troll. Tobias tries communicating with the troll but is killed when the creature is startled by more gunfire. Researching the mythology, Nora recommends a sonic attack using church bells, but it enrages instead of incapacitates the creature, causing immense collateral damage. Following the rampage, international news outlets pick up the story and broadcast it globally.

As the troll heads to Norway's capital Oslo, the prime minister orders a complete evacuation of the city. After learning of the government's plan to destroy the troll with a nuclear bomb on Oslo, Nora and Andreas object, but are dismissed from the task force. Nora makes a last attempt to find out the truth about the creature. Tobias' notes lead them to the Royal Palace, where they meet Chief of Court Rikard Sinding, who reveals the truth about trolls in Norway. Tobias had been right all along; Trolls had been living in Norway until they were wiped out by Christian settlers and the truth buried in folklore. When Nora's father got too close to the truth, Sinding had him discredited and committed to a mental health hospital. The Royal palace was built on top of the Troll King's palace after the Christians massacred his family and left him for dead inside a cavern in the Dovre mountains. Nora concludes that the creature is heading for Oslo in an attempt to return home.

Discovering that trolls are vulnerable to direct sunlight, Nora and Kris plan to expose the troll to UV light from a number of tanning beds. While Kris calls on fellow soldiers to make the troll trap, Andreas asks his friend Sigrid at the secret government facility to delay the bombing of Oslo. Sigrid hacks into the military's system to halt the nuclear strike. Nora and Andreas place the skull of one of the troll's babies in the back of the Queen's truck and lure him to the UV light trap. Nora has a last-minute change of heart, turns off the lights, and tries to save the creature's life. However, the sun then rises into a clear sky and kills the troll. While everyone else rejoices, Andreas and Nora wonder if more trolls are still alive deep inside Norway's mountains.

In the aftermath, something seems to emerge with a roar from the rubble inside the Dovre mountain cave.

Cast

 Ine Marie Wilmann as Professor Nora Tidemann
 Ameli Olving Sælevik as young Nora Tidemann
 Kim Falck as Andreas Isaksen
 Mads Sjøgård Pettersen as Captain Kristoffer Holm
 Gard B. Eidsvold as Tobias Tidemann
 Anneke von der Lippe as Prime Minister Berit Moberg
 Fridtjov Såheim as Minister of Defence Frederick Markussen
 Dennis Storhøi as Chief of Defence General Sverre Lunde
 Karoline Viktoria Sletteng Garvang as Sigrid Hodne
 Yusuf Toosh Ibra as Amir
 Bjarne Hjelde as Chief of Court Rikard Sinding
 Billy Campbell as Dr. David Secord
 Jon Ketil Johnsen as Professor Møller
 Duc Paul Mai-The as Professor Wangel
 Ingrid Vollan as Oddrun Gundersen
 Trond Magnum as Lars Gundersen
 Pål Richard Lunderby as Fisker
 Eric Vorenholt as an OPS officer
 Hugo Mikal Skår as a helicopter soldier

Production

Development
Roar Uthaug met with Motion Blur executives when his film Tomb Raider was near completion to discuss creating a film. Uthaug decided to utilize a Norwegian folklore-inspired idea that he had been pondering for more than two decades.

News website TheWrap officially announced Troll on 25 August 2020, with an article featuring a synopsis, and a statement from Uthaug. In March 2021, Bloody Disgusting revealed concept art of the titular monster attacking Oslo. In January 2022, David Kosse of Netflix described the film as "a giant four-quadrant event movie that happens to take place in Norway... with a troll."

Filming
Principal photography for Troll began in August 2021 and wrapped in November, with location shooting taking place in Askim, Dovre, Indre Østfold, Lom, Øyer, Rena, and Ulsteinvik.

Music
The music for Troll was written by Johannes Ringen.

Release

Distribution

Troll was distributed by Netflix on 1 December 2022.

Critical response

On review aggregator Rotten Tomatoes, the film holds an approval rating of 88% based on 26 reviews, with an average rating of 6.40. The site's consensus reads, "Troll doesn't rewrite the monster movie rulebooks -- but with mythology this rich and action this exciting, it doesn't have to". Metacritic assigns the film a score (using a weighted average) of 62 out of 100, indicating "generally favorable" reviews.

Critics deemed the story of a giant monster that wreaks havoc in a populous city derivative of Godzilla and King Kong films. Marco Vito Oddo of Collider gave it a rating of C+, writing that while its "not getting any awards for originality" it nevertheless "delivers what it promises by telling a story about a giant creature that destroys cities in its waking and the humans who try to prevent catastrophe." Michael Gingold, writing for Rue Morgue, said that "clearly, Uthaug is not taking all this entirely seriously, but he never pitches [the film] as a spoof," adding: "he takes spectacle seriously–even when at least one of the operations enacted to subdue the titan border on the downright goofy–and to that end, the visual effects of the troll and its devastation are first-rate, both out in rural areas, including a great reveal that's unfortunately given away in the trailer, and in the midst of the city of Oslo." South China Morning Post reviewer James Marsh felt that despite "the effects work is first-rate and the action efficiently handled", it features a "frustrating lack of Scandinavian specificity on display, with Uthaug more eager to emulate blockbusters like Jurassic Park and Godzilla than introduce international viewers to his homeland’s unique folkloric threats."

Bloody Disgusting's Meagan Navarro felt that "what Troll lacks in originality, it makes up for in fresh mythology", and concluded "it's fun enough and does deliver on spectacle, but most of all, it leaves you rooting for its magnificent creature." Screen Anarchy critic Peter Martin commented "the movie feels faintly familiar," adding: "while refreshingly different, featuring new wrinkles that are well-considered and profoundly satisfying."

Future
In an interview with What's on Netflix, producer Kristian Strand Sinkerud stated that the crew "have ambitions to make a sequel and perhaps two sequels, but it all depends on how the audience are responding to [the film]." Director Uthaug added: "right now we're focused on one big entertaining movie and let's see how the response is to that."

References

External links
 Official webpage at Motion Blur
 
 
 

2022 action films
2020s monster movies
Films about trolls
Films directed by Roar Uthaug
Films set in Norway
Giant monster films
Kaiju films
Norwegian-language Netflix original films
2020s Norwegian-language films
Norwegian fantasy films
Norwegian action films
Norwegian action thriller films
Norwegian adventure films